Al Akhbar is an Urdu daily newspaper in Pakistan. The newspaper is published from Islamabad, with an edition published in Muzaffarabad as well. As of 2004 Ghulam Akbar was the editor of the newspaper.

See also
 List of newspapers in Pakistan

References

External links
 Al-Akhbar Official Site

Daily newspapers published in Pakistan
Publications with year of establishment missing
Urdu-language newspapers published in Pakistan
Mass media in Islamabad